The 1900 Montana gubernatorial election was held on November 6, 1900.

Democratic nominee Joseph Toole defeated Republican nominee David S. Folsom and Independent Democrat nominee Thomas S. Hogan with 49.24% of the vote.

General election

Candidates
Joseph Toole, Democratic, former Governor
David S. Folsom, Republican, former State Senator
Thomas S. Hogan, Independent Democrat, incumbent Secretary of State of Montana
Julius F. Fox, Social Democrat

Results

References

Bibliography
 
 
 

1900
Montana
Gubernatorial